Newport East is a census-designated place (CDP) in the town of Middletown, Newport County, Rhode Island, United States.  The CDP encompasses the portion of the urban area of the city of Newport that extends beyond the municipal boundaries. The population of the CDP was 11,769 at the 2010 census.

Geography 
Newport East is located at  (41.508602, -71.288093).

According to the United States Census Bureau, the CDP has a total area of 5.9 mi2 (15.2 km2).  5.7 mi2 (14.7 km2), and 0.2 mi2 (0.5 km2) of it (3.24%) is water.

Demographics 

As of the census of 2000, there were 11,463 people, 4,905 households, and 3,011 families residing in the CDP.  The population density was 2,019.0/mi2 (779.2/km2).  There were 5,206 housing units at an average density of 917.0/mi2 (353.9/km2).  The racial makeup of the CDP was 90.46% White, 4.04% African American, 0.37% Native American, 1.86% Asian, 0.11% Pacific Islander, 0.85% from other races, and 2.31% from two or more races.  Hispanic or Latino of any race were 2.17% of the population.

There were 4,905 households, out of which 27.0% had children under the age of 18 living with them, 47.2% were married couples living together, 11.3% had a female householder with no husband present, and 38.6% were non-families. 32.9% of all households were made up of individuals, and 13.4% had someone living alone who was 65 years of age or older.  The average household size was 2.28 and the average family size was 2.90.

In the CDP, the population was spread out, with 21.6% under the age of 18, 6.5% from 18 to 24, 28.3% from 25 to 44, 25.4% from 45 to 64, and 18.2% who were 65 years of age or older.  The median age was 41 years.  For every 100 females, there were 90.6 males.  For every 100 females age 18 and over, there were 86.0 males.

The median income for a household in the CDP was $49,552, and the median income for a family was $57,314. Males had a median income of $41,026 versus $28,090 for females. The per capita income for the CDP was $25,193.  About 4.1% of families and 5.5% of the population were below the poverty line, including 6.6% of those under the age of 18 and 4.9% of those 65 and older.

References

Census-designated places in Newport County, Rhode Island
Providence metropolitan area
Census-designated places in Rhode Island